Ben Anthony Swakali (born 23 July 2002), known as Ben Starkie, is a professional footballer who plays as a defensive midfielder for Basford United. Born in England, he plays for the Tanzania national team.

Club career
A youth product of Rugby Town and Wilhelmshaven, Starkie moved to Shepshed Dynamo on 16 July 2021. On 13 November 2021, he transferred to Spalding United.

International career
Starkie was called up to represent the Tanzania U17s on 30 January 2019, becoming the first ever international call-up from Rugby Town F.C. He represented the Tanzania U20s at the 2021 Africa U-20 Cup of Nations. He was called up to the senior Tanzania national team for a set of friendlies in March 2022. He debuted with Tanzania in a 3–1 friendly win over Central African Republic on 24 March 2022.

References

External links
 
 Pitchero profile

2002 births
Living people
Tanzanian footballers
Tanzania international footballers
Tanzania under-20 international footballers
English footballers
Tanzanian people of English descent
English people of Tanzanian descent
Association football midfielders
Spalding United F.C. players
Northern Premier League players
Expatriate footballers in Germany
Tanzanian expatriates in Germany
Tanzanian expatriate footballers
English expatriate sportspeople in Germany